Commonwealth Association of Architects (CAA), formed in 1965, is an organisation for national and regional institutes representing architects in Commonwealth countries. As such, under the Commonwealth family, the association validates courses in architecture and convenes international boards to educational institutions to assess course components against set criteria. Its current membership list is 34 nations. Sir Robert Matthew CBE served as the first President from 1965 to 1969. Vince Cassar is the present president of the organization. 

The CAA is a registered charity in the UK.

In 2012 the UK's Royal Institute of British Architects (RIBA) ceased (after many decades) to recognise CAA accreditation of Commonwealth architecture schools, after the CAA refused to grant 'significant' RIBA representation on its accreditation panels to inspect schools first-hand. At the time CAA validated 41 colleges, though only visited 15 of them beforehand.

A five-day International Architectural Exhibition of the Commonwealth Association of Architects was held in Battaramulla, Colombo, Sri Lanka in November 2013. It ran at the same time as the Commonwealth Heads of Government Meeting. 

The organisation held a two-day international summit in London, in June 2015, to celebrate its 50th anniversary.

Sources

External links

Commonwealth Association of Architects at the Commonwealth
Commonwealth Association of Architects at the Commonwealth of Nations
Association on pinterest

 
Commonwealth Family
Organizations established in 1965
Architecture-related professional associations